Ève Landry (born June 5, 1985, in Saint-Pascal, Quebec) is an actress from Quebec. After a time at the Ligue nationale d'improvisation, she began to appear on TV in the Ici Radio-Canada Télé show Unité 9 in the bad girl character of Jeanne Biron.

She attended the Festival de Cannes to present the TV show at the MIPCOM.

Filmography

Television
 Musée Eden (2010) - Amie de Lucie Bolduc (1 episode)
 Penthouse 5-0 (2011) - Mylène (2 episodes)
 Mirador (2011) - Étudiante Vox pop (1 episode)
 Agent Secret (2014) - Francine (2 episodes)
 Unité 9 (2012-2019) - Jeanne Biron (main character)
 Épidémie (2020) - Françoise Dufour (7 episodes)
 M'entends-tu? (2018-2021) - Carolanne (main character)
 District 31 (2021-2022) - Mélanie Charron (100 episodes)

References

External links 

Public profile on Facebook.

Actresses from Quebec
1985 births
People from Bas-Saint-Laurent
Living people
Canadian television actresses
21st-century Canadian actresses
French Quebecers